Poprad is a city in Slovakia. It may also refer to:
Poprad (river)
Poprad (self-propelled anti-aircraft missile system)